Bernard I was the count of Berga from 1035 to 1050. He was the sixth of seven sons of Wilfred II of Cerdanya and his father's successor in Berga.

He died without heirs and his county passed to brother number seven: Berengar.

1050 deaths
Year of birth unknown
11th-century Visigothic people
11th-century Catalan people